The Journey (Livin' Hits) is the second greatest hits album by American country music artist Craig Morgan. It was released on September 3, 2013 via Black River Entertainment. The album includes four new tracks, including the singles "Wake Up Lovin' You" and "We'll Come Back Around". Most of the songs featured are re-recordings.

Track listing

Personnel
 Eddie Bayers - drums
 Jim "Moose" Brown - keyboards
 Tom Bukovac - electric guitar
 Dan Fitzsell - drum loops, programming
 Shannon Forrest - drums
 Larry Franklin - fiddle, mandolin
 Kevin "Swine" Grantt - bass guitar
 Kenny Greenberg - electric guitar
 Rob Hajacos - fiddle
 Tony Harrell - keyboards
 Wes Hightower - background vocals
 Mike Johnson - dobro, steel guitar
 Jeff King - electric guitar
 Wade Kirby - drum loops, programming 
 James Mitchell - electric guitar
 Craig Morgan - lead vocals, background vocals
 Phil O'Donnell - banjo, acoustic guitar, percussion, background vocals
 Russ Pahl - jews harp
 Adam Shoenfeld - electric guitar
 Summer Shyvonne - background vocals
 Joe Spivey - fiddle, mandolin
 Russell Terrell - background vocals
 John Willis - banjo, acoustic guitar, mandolin
 Derek Wolfford - percussion

Chart performance

Album

Singles

References

2013 greatest hits albums
Craig Morgan albums
Black River Entertainment albums